The judiciary of Mongolia is made up of a three-tiered court system (first instance, appellate, supreme court) divided into three branches (civil, criminal, administrative cases). For questions of constitutional law there is a separate constitutional court. Besides there are forms of alternative dispute resolution.

First instance
First instance court types are:
 District first instance court for civil cases
 District first instance court for criminal cases
 Number: 4 each; named after Ulaanbaatar city districts.
 Inter-soum first instance court for civil cases
 Inter-soum first instance court for criminal cases
 Number: 21 each; named after an aimag.
 Inter-soum court
 Number: 8; each named after an aimag's soum.
 First instance court for administrative cases (захиргааны хэргийн анхан шатны шүүх / ЗХАШ шүүх)
 Number: 22; one for Ulaanbaatar and each aimag.

The Bayan-Ölgii courts of first instance bear alternative Kazakh names.

Appellate instance
Appellate court types are:
 Capital city appellate court for civil cases
 Capital city appellate court for criminal cases
 Number: 1 each.
 Aimag appellate court for civil cases
 Aimag appellate court for criminal cases
 Number: 8 each; named after the aimags concerned.
 Appellate court for administrative cases
 Number: 1.

Supreme Court
The highest court in Mongolia is the Supreme Court of Mongolia, established in 1927. There are chambers for civil, criminal and administrative cases. The court hears general appeals from courts of lower instance as well as from the Constitutional Court in matters regarding the protection of law and human rights.

Additional legislation and bodies

Procedure
The courts' procedure is governed by the Law on civil procedure, the Criminal procedure law, the Law on the execution of court decisions, and the Law on administrative procedure.

Court administration
The Judicial General Council of Mongolia is to maintain the independence of the judiciary. The status of judges is determined by a separate law. The number of judges for each court is set by parliament.

Alternative dispute resolution
For commercial disputes there is among others the Mongolian International and National Arbitration Center (MINAC), established in 1960 at the Mongolian National Chamber of Commerce and Industry (MNCCI). The Law on mediation and conciliation provides for further forms of alternative dispute resolution.

Constitutional court
Mongolia's highest court in constitutional matters is the Constitutional Court of Mongolia. It was established in 1992 and has its own procedural law.

References